is a word in the Samoan language which means 'family.' 
 consists of a wider family group of blood and marriage or even adopted connections who all acknowledge the matai (head of the family). In Samoan custom relationship may be claimed through female as well as male ancestors. Samoans may belong to many families or different  since a woman marrying into another family confers on all her blood descendants membership of her own.

They are the trustee of the good name of the family and the fountain-head to which all ceremonial recognition of the status of the family is due.  are also responsible for the proper maintenance of the dignity of the family and the adequate performance of their social obligations.

Another aspect of family organisation which is very important indeed in Samoan custom, is that which deals with the male and female lines of descent of a family. The respectful and traditional relationships raised by the  permeate the whole of Samoan society, and must always be taken into account at the time of the choice of a new  and on other important occasions including marriages and deaths.

See also
 
 Samoan culture

References

External links
 "Faasamoa - The Samoan Way", American Samoa government website

Samoan culture
Samoan words and phrases
Family in Samoa